is a professor at Tokyo Women's Medical University. He instructed Haruko Obokata there and wrote a paper on STAP cell with her, Charles Vacanti and Yoshiki Sasai.

He was interested in tacit knowing, a concept which Michael Polanyi and Shinichiro Kurimoto also developed.

Career
Yamato was born at Tokyo in 1964. 
He graduated from Tokyo University.

Works
'Gossipy Cells'(Oshaberina Saibou tachi　おしゃべりな細胞たち ) published by Kodansha

References

Japanese biologists
Living people
1964 births
University of Tokyo alumni